John Leech (21 July 1926 in Weybridge, Surrey – 28 September 1992 in Scotland) was a British mathematician working in number theory, geometry and combinatorial group theory. He is best known for his discovery of the Leech lattice in 1965. He also discovered Ta(3) in 1957. Leech was married to Jenifer Haselgrove, a British radio scientist.

References

External links
 MacTutor History of Mathematics biography

20th-century British  mathematicians
1926 births
1992 deaths